The Dwight family of New England had many members who were military leaders, educators, jurists, authors, businessmen and clergy.

Around 1634, John Dwight came with his wife Hannah, daughter Hannah, and sons Timothy (1629–1718) and John (d. 1638) from Dedham, Essex, England, to Dedham, Massachusetts. John and Hannah Dwight had two more daughters before John Dwight died in 1660. The known descendants of John and Hannah Dwight are from their two grandsons (children of Timothy and his third wife Anna Flint): Justice Nathaniel Dwight (1666–1711) and Captain Henry Dwight (1676–1732).

Nathaniel Dwight 
Justice Nathaniel Dwight (1666–1711) married Mehitable Partridge (1675–1756) in 1693. Their descendants were:

 Colonel Timothy Dwight II (1694–1771), lawyer married Experience King (1693–1763)
 Major Timothy Dwight III (1726–1777), married Mary Edwards (1734–1807), daughter of theologian Jonathan Edwards (1703–1758)
 Timothy Dwight IV (1752–1817), president of Yale College 1795–1817, married Margaret (or Mary) Woolsey (1754–1777)
 Benjamin Woolsey Dwight (1780–1850), physician married Sophia Woodbridge Strong (1793–1861.
 Benjamin Woodbridge Dwight (1816–1889), educator and author
 Theodore William Dwight (1822–1892), lawyer
 Edward W. Dwight (1827–1904), member of the Wisconsin State Assembly
 James Dwight (1784–1863), married Susan Breed (1785–1851)
 Timothy Dwight V (1828–1916), president of Yale University 1886–1898
  Sereno Edwards Dwight (1786–1850), author and minister, married Susan Edwards Daggett, daughter of David Daggett (1764–1851, founder of the Yale College Law School. David Daggett was a descendant of Hannah Mayhew Daggett, daughter of Gov. Thomas Mayhew of Martha's Vineyard.
 William Theodore Dwight (1795–1865), clergyman
 Theodore Dwight (1764–1846), journalist, married Abigail Alsop (1765–1846), the sister of Richard Alsop (1761–1815)
 Theodore Dwight (1796–1866), author, married Eleanor Boyd.
 Elizabeth Dwight (1772–1813) married William Walton Woolsey (1766–1839)
 Mary Anne Woolsey (1793–1871) married Jared Scarborough and then George Hoadley (1781–1857)
 Elizabeth Dwight Hoadley married General Joshua Hall Bates (1817–1908)
 George Hoadly (1826–1902), governor of Ohio
 John Mumford Woolsey (1796–1870) married Jane Andrews
 Sarah Chauncey Woolsey (1835–1905), author published What Katy Did as "Susan Coolidge"
 Elisabeth Dwight Woolsey (1838–1910) married Daniel Coit Gilman
 William Walton Woolsey (1842–1910), plantation owner, married Catherine Buckingham Convers, daughter of Charles Cleveland Convers, and then Bessie Gammell
 Gamel Woolsey (1895–1968), author, married Gerald Brenan
 Theodore Dwight Woolsey (1801–1889), president of Yale 1846–1871, married Elizabeth Salsbury and then Sarah Pritchard
 Theodore Salisbury Woolsey (1852–1929), legal scholar
 Theodore Salisbury Woolsey, Jr. (1880–1933), forestry professor
 Abiah Dwight (1704–1748), married Samuel Kent
 Abiah Kent (1724–1782), married John Leavitt (1724–1798), Esq., brother of Jemima (Leavitt) Ellsworth
 Thaddeus Leavitt (1750–1826), merchant, Suffield, Connecticut, married Elizabeth King
 Thaddeus Leavitt Jr. (1778–1828), married Jemima Loomis (1779–1846)
 Jane Maria Leavitt  (1801–1877) married Jonathan Hunt Jr. (1787–1832)
 William Morris Hunt (1824–1879), painter, married Louisa Dumerique Perkins of Boston
 Jonathan Hunt, M.D., (1826–1874) physician in Paris, France
 Richard Morris Hunt (1827–1895), architect, married Catherine Clinton Howland (1841–1880), sister of Joseph Howland
  Colonel Leavitt Hunt (1831–1907), pioneer photographer, attorney, inventor, farmer, married Katherine Jarvis
 Jarvis Hunt (1863–1941), architect, Chicago, Illinois
 Captain John Leavitt (1755–1815), co-founder, Leavittsburg, Ohio, farmer, innkeeper
 Humphrey H. Leavitt (1796–1873), Ohio politician, United States District Court judge
 John McDowell Leavitt (1824–1909), Episcopal clergyman, university president
 John Brooks Leavitt (1849–1930), New York City attorney, author and civic reformer
 Mehitable Dwight (1705–1767), married Captain Abraham Burbank (1703–1767), large landholder, residing at Suffield, Connecticut. 
 Abraham Burbank, Esq. (1739–1808), lawyer, Yale 1759, Massachusetts Legislature from 1779 to 1808; delegate to Constitutional Convention, 1780; Justice of the Peace in June 1772 and a commissary during the Revolutionary War; married (1) Bethia Cushing (1740–1768) (2) Sarah Pomeroy (1744–1808), daughter of General Seth Pomeroy.
 Arthur Burbank (1782–1839) farmer, married Sarah Bates (1789–1870), daughter of Revolutionary War Soldier Eleazer Bates (1749–1826)
 Abraham Burbank (1813–1887), largest real estate owner in Pittsfield, Mass.; builder, hardware store owner, hotel operator, married Julia M. Brown (1812–1897)

Henry Dwight 
Captain Henry Dwight (1676–1732), farmer, merchant and judge, married Lydia Hawley (1680–1748).
Their descendants were:

 Brig. General Joseph Dwight (1703–1765), judge in Great Barrington, Massachusetts, married Mary Pynchon, and then Abigail (Williams) Sargeant (1721–1791), half-sister to Ephraim Williams Jr.
Lydia Dwight (1732-1798) married Rev. Dr. John Willard (1733-1807), brother of Joseph Willard, former president of Harvard College. Rev.Dr. John Willard was a mentor of Rev. Abishai Alden and a descendant of Major Simon Willard. See Endicott Rock history.
 Joseph Dwight, Jr. (1737–1826) married Lydia Dewey (1745–1811)
 Solomon Dwight (1769–1813) married Veina Foster
 Elijah Dwight (1797–1868) married Olive Standish (1795–1874), descended from Myles Standish
 Jeremiah W. Dwight (1819–1885), New York State politician
 John Wilbur Dwight (1859–1928), New York State politician
 Pamela Dwight (1753*–1807), married Judge Theodore Sedgwick (1746–1813)
 Theodore Sedgwick (1780–1839), lawyer and diplomat, married Susan Anne Livingson (1788–1867)
 Theodore Sedgwick (1811–1859), lawyer and author
 Henry Dwight Sedgwick (1785–1831), anti-slavery lawyer, married Jane Minot (1795–1859)
 Henry Dwight Sedgwick II (1824–1857), married Henrietta Ellery Sedgwick (1829–1899)
 Catharine Sedgwick (1789–1867), novelist
 Charles Sedgwick (1791–1856), clerk of Massachusetts Supreme Court, married Elizabeth Buckminster Dwight (1801–1864)
 Catharine Maria Sedgwick (1820–1880) married William Minot II (1817–1894)
 Charles Sedgwick Minot (1852–1914), anatomist
 Henry Williams Dwight (1757–1804), married Abigail Welles (1763–1840), descended from Thomas Welles
 Henry Williams Dwight (1788–1845), lawyer and politician
 Edwin Welles Dwight (1789–1841), author and minister
 Captain Seth Dwight (1707–1774), farmer, married Abigail Strong (1710–1780)
 Ensign Josiah Dwight (1747–1796) married Tabitha Bigelow (c. 1740–1796)
  Seth Dwight (1769–1825), merchant, married Hannah Strong (1768–1813)
 Harriet Dwight (1792–1870) married James Dana
 James Dwight Dana (1813–1895), geologist, married Henrietta Frances Silliman (1823–1907), daughter of chemist Benjamin Silliman (1779–1864)
 Edward Salisbury Dana (1849–1935), mineralogist
 Harrison Gray Otis Dwight (1803–1862), missionary to Turkey, married Mary Lane (1811–1860)
 Henry Otis Dwight (1843–1917), missionary to Turkey, married Mary A. Bliss
 Sarah Hinsdale Dwight, missionary married Edward Riggs, the son on Elias Riggs (1810–1901)
 Josiah Dwight Jr. (1772–1826) married Sarah Hartwell (1772–1822)
 Morris Dwight, M.D. (1796–?) married Minerva Bryant (1800–?)
 Colonel Augustus Wade Dwight (1827–1865) died in American Civil War
 Colonel Josiah Dwight (1715–1768), merchant and judge, married Elizabeth Buckminster (1731–1798)
 Thomas Dwight (1758–1819), politician, married Hannah Worthington (1761–1833)
 Clarissa Dwight (1762–1820) married Major Abel Whitney (1756–1807)
 Josiah Dwight Whitney (1786–1869), merchant, married Sarah Williston (1800–1833)
 Josiah Dwight Whitney (1819–1896), geologist
  William Dwight Whitney (1827–1894), linguist, married Elizabeth Wooster Baldwin, daughter of Roger Sherman Baldwin
 Edward Baldwin Whitney (1857–1911), judge, married A. Josepha Newcomb, daughter of Simon Newcomb
 Hassler Whitney (1907–1989)  mathematician
 Josiah Dwight, Jr. (1767–1821), merchant, married Rhoda Edwards (1778–1864), granddaughter of Jonathan Edwards
  Elizabeth Buckminster Dwight (1801–1864) married distant cousin Charles Sedgwick (1791–1856), see above
 Edmund Dwight (1717–1755) married Elizabeth Scutt (1724–1764)
  Jonathan Dwight (1743–1831) married Margaret Ashley (1745–1789)
 Jonathan Dwight Jr. (1772–1840), merchant and politician, married Sarah Shepard (1774–1805)
 Jonathan Dwight, third (1799–1856), merchant, married Ann Bartlett
 Jonathan Dwight fourth (1831–1910), civil engineer, married Julia Lawrence Hasbrouck
 Jonathan Dwight fifth (1858–1929), ornithologist
 William Dwight (1805–?) married Elizabeth Amelia White
 General William Dwight, Jr. (1831–1888), in American Civil War
 Thomas Dwight (1807–?) married Mary Collins Warren, daughter of John Collins Warren
 Thomas Dwight (1843–1911), physician, anatomy author and teacher
 Edmund Dwight (1780–1849), merchant and philanthropist, married Mary Harrison Eliot

See also
 Sedgwick family
 Whitney family
 Leavitt family
 Hunt family

Notes

References

People from Dedham, Massachusetts
Families from Massachusetts
Hunt family of Vermont
American families of English ancestry